Microcolona tumulifera is a moth in the family Elachistidae. It is found on Java.

The wingspan is about 8 mm. The forewings are ochreous-brown, irregularly irrorated with blackish. There is a very large subdorsal tuft at one-third and a very small one in the disc before the middle, a moderate subdorsal tuft beyond the middle and a large transverse tuft mixed with whitish at three-fourths. The hindwings are pale grey.

References

Moths described in 1921
Microcolona
Moths of Asia